John Eric Maenchen is an electrical engineer with Sandia National Laboratories in Arlington, Virginia. He was named a Fellow of the Institute of Electrical and Electronics Engineers (IEEE) in 2012 for his work in the development of intense pulsed charged particle beams, and their application for flash radiography.

References

Fellow Members of the IEEE
Sandia National Laboratories people
Living people
Year of birth missing (living people)
Place of birth missing (living people)
American electrical engineers